ICD-9-CM Volume 3 is a system of procedural codes used by health insurers to classify medical procedures for billing purposes. It is a subset of the International Statistical Classification of Diseases and Related Health Problems (ICD) 9-CM.
Volumes 1 and 2 are used for diagnostic codes.

Main sections

(00) Procedures and interventions, not elsewhere classified 
() Procedures and interventions, not elsewhere classified
 Procedures on blood vessels
 Percutaneous angioplasty or atherectomy of precerebral (extracranial) vessel(s)

(01–05) Operations on the nervous system 
() Incision and excision of skull, brain, and cerebral meninges
() Craniotomy and craniectomy
() Incision of brain and cerebral meninges
() Lobotomy and tractotomy
() Other excision or destruction of brain and meninges
() Hemispherectomy
() Other operations on skull, brain, and cerebral meninges
() Ventriculostomy
() Operations on spinal cord and spinal canal structures
() Exploration and decompression of spinal canal structures
() Other exploration and decompression of spinal canal
 Laminectomy
() Division of intraspinal nerve root
 Rhizotomy
() Chordotomy
() Diagnostic procedures on spinal cord and spinal canal structures
() Spinal tap
() Operations on cranial and other nerves
() Incision, division, and excision of cranial and other nerves
() Gasserian ganglionectomy
() Other cranial or peripheral ganglionectomy
() Injection into a nerve
() Injection of anesthetic into a nerve for analgesia
() Operations on sympathetic nerves or ganglia
() Sympathectomy
() Sphenopalatine ganglionectomy
() Other sympathectomy and ganglionectomy

(06–07) Operations on the endocrine system 
() Operations on thyroid and parathyroid glands
() Incision of thyroid field
() Diagnostic procedures on thyroid and parathyroid glands
() Unilateral thyroid lobectomy
() Other partial thyroidectomy
() Complete thyroidectomy
() Substernal thyroidectomy
() Excision of lingual thyroid
() Excision of thyroglossal duct or tract
() Parathyroidectomy
() Other operations on thyroid (region) and parathyroid
() Operations on other endocrine glands
() Exploration of adrenal field
() Diagnostic procedures on adrenal glands, pituitary gland, pineal gland, and thymus
() Partial adrenalectomy
() Bilateral adrenalectomy
() Other operations on adrenal glands, nerves, and vessels
() Operations on pineal gland
() Hypophysectomy
() Other operations on hypophysis
() Thymectomy
() Other operations on thymus

(08–16) Operations on the eye 
 Operations on eyelids
 Operations on lacrimal system
 Operations on conjunctiva
 Operations on cornea
 Corneal transplant
 Other reconstructive and refractive surgery on cornea
 Keratomileusis
 Radial keratotomy
 Operations on iris, ciliary body, sclera, and anterior chamber
 Operations on lens
 Cataract surgery
 Phacoemulsification and aspiration of cataract
 Operations on retina, choroid, vitreous, and posterior chamber
 Removal of foreign body from posterior segment of eye
 Diagnostic procedures on retina, choroid, vitreous, and posterior chamber
 Destruction of lesion of retina and choroid
 Repair of retinal tear
 Repair of retinal detachment with scleral buckling and implant
 Other repair of retinal detachment
 Removal of surgically implanted material from posterior segment of eye
 Operations on vitreous
 Other operations on retina, choroid, and posterior chamber
 Operations on extraocular muscles
 Operations on orbit and eyeball
 Enucleation of the Eye

(18–20) Operations on the ear 
 Operations on external ear
 Incision of external ear
 Diagnostic procedures on external ear
 Excision or destruction of lesion of external ear
 Other excision of external ear
 Suture of laceration of external ear
 Surgical correction of prominent ear
 Reconstruction of external auditory canal
 Other plastic repair of external ear
 Construction of auricle of ear
 Reattachment of amputated ear
 Other plastic repair of external ear
 Otoplasty NOS
 Other operations on external ear
 Reconstructive operations on middle ear
 Stapes mobilization
 Stapedectomy
 Revision of stapedectomy
 Other operations on ossicular chain
 Myringoplasty
 Other tympanoplasty
 Revision of tympanoplasty
 Other repair of middle ear
 Other operations on middle and inner ear
 Myringotomy
 Removal of tympanostomy tube
 Incision of mastoid and middle ear
 Diagnostic procedures on middle and inner ear
 Mastoidectomy
 Other excision of middle ear
 Fenestration of inner ear
 Incision, excision, and destruction of inner ear
 Operations on Eustachian tube
 Other operations on inner and middle ear

(21-29) Operations on the nose, mouth and pharynx 
() Operations on nose
() Control of epistaxis
() Incision of nose
() Diagnostic procedures on nose
() Local excision or destruction of lesion of nose
() Resection of nose
() Submucous Resection (SMR) of nasal septum
() Turbinectomy
() Reduction of nasal fracture
() Repair and plastic operations on the nose
() Suture of laceration of nose
() Closure of nasal fistula
() Total nasal reconstruction
() Revision rhinoplasty
() Augmentation rhinoplasty
() Limited rhinoplasty
() Other rhinoplasty
() Other septoplasty
() Other repair and plastic operations on nose
() Other operations on nose
() Operations on nasal sinuses
() Removal and restoration of teeth
 Forceps extraction of tooth
 Surgical removal of tooth
 Restoration of tooth by filling
 Restoration of tooth by inlay
 Other dental restoration
 Implantation of tooth
 Prosthetic dental implant
 Apicoectomy and root canal therapy
() Other operations on teeth, gums, and alveoli
 Incision of gum or alveolar bone
 Diagnostic procedures on teeth, gums, and alveoli
 Gingivoplasty
 Other operations on gum
 Excision of dental lesion of jaw
 Alveoloplasty
 Exposure of tooth
 Application of orthodontic appliance
 Other orthodontic operation
 Other dental operations
() Operations on tongue
 Diagnostic procedures on tongue
 Excision or destruction of lesion or tissue of tongue
 Partial glossectomy
 Complete glossectomy
 Radical glossectomy
 Repair of tongue and glossoplasty
 Other operations on tongue
 Lingual frenotomy
 Lingual frenectomy
 Lysis of adhesions of tongue
 Other glossotomy
 Other
() Operations on salivary glands and ducts
() Other operations on mouth and face
 Drainage of face and floor of mouth
 Incision of palate
 Diagnostic procedures on oral cavity
 Excision of lesion or tissue of bony palate
 Excision of other parts of mouth
 Labial frenectomy
 Wide excision of lesion of lip
 Other excision of lesion or tissue of lip
 Other excision of mouth
 Plastic repair of mouth
 Palatoplasty
 Operations on uvula
 Other operations on mouth and face
() Operations on tonsils and adenoids
 Tonsillectomy without adenoidectomy
 Tonsillectomy with adenoidectomy
 Adenoidectomy without tonsillectomy
() Operations on pharynx

(30–34) Operations on the respiratory system 
 Excision of larynx
 Excision or destruction of lesion or tissue of larynx
 Hemilaryngectomy
 Other partial laryngectomy
 Complete laryngectomy
 Radical laryngectomy
 Other operations on larynx and trachea
 Injection of larynx
 Temporary tracheostomy
 Permanent tracheostomy
 Other incision of larynx or trachea
 Diagnostic procedures on larynx and trachea
 Local excision or destruction of lesion or tissue of trachea
 Repair of larynx
 Repair and plastic operations on trachea
 Other operations on larynx and trachea
 Excision of lung and bronchus
 Local excision or destruction of lesion or tissue of bronchus
 Other excision of bronchus
 Local excision or destruction of lesion or tissue of lung
 Segmental resection of lung
 Lobectomy of lung
 Complete pneumonectomy
 Radical dissection of thoracic structures
 Other excision of lung
 Other operations on lung and bronchus
 Incision of bronchus
 Incision of lung
 Diagnostic procedures on lung and bronchus
 Bronchoscopy through artificial stoma
 Fiber-optic bronchoscopy
 Other bronchoscopy
 Closed (endoscopic) biopsy of bronchus
 Open biopsy of bronchus
 Closed (percutaneous) (needle) biopsy of lung
 Closed endoscopic biopsy of lung
 Open biopsy of lung
 Other diagnostic procedures on lung and bronchus
 Surgical collapse of lung
 Repair and plastic operation on lung and bronchus
 Lung transplant
 Combined heart-lung transplantation
 Other operations on lung and bronchus
 Operations on chest wall, pleura, mediastinum, and diaphragm
 Incision of chest wall and pleura
 Exploratory thoracotomy
 Incision of mediastinum
 Diagnostic procedures on chest wall, pleura, mediastinum, and diaphragm
 Transpleural thoracoscopy
 Mediastinoscopy
 Biopsy of chest wall
 Pleural biopsy
 Closed (percutaneous) (needle) biopsy of mediastinum
 Open mediastinal biopsy
 Biopsy of diaphragm
 Other diagnostic procedures on chest wall, pleura, and diaphragm
 Other diagnostic procedures on mediastinum
 Excision or destruction of lesion or tissue of mediastinum
 Excision or destruction of lesion of chest wall
 Pleurectomy
 Scarification of pleura
 Repair of chest wall
 Repair of pectus deformity
 Operations on diaphragm
 Other operations on thorax
 Thoracentesis
 Injection into thoracic cavity
 Chemical pleurodesis

(35–39) Operations on the cardiovascular system

Heart 
 Operations on valves and septa of heart
 Closed heart valvotomy
 Open heart valvuloplasty without replacement
 Replacement of heart valve
 Operations on structures adjacent to heart valves
 Production of septal defect in heart
 Repair of atrial and ventricular septa with prosthesis
 Repair of atrial and ventricular septa with tissue graft
 Other and unspecified repair of atrial and ventricular septa
 Total repair of certain congenital cardiac anomalies
 Other operations on valves and septa of heart
 Creation of conduit between atrium and pulmonary artery
 Fontan procedure
 Operations on vessels of heart
 Removal of coronary artery obstruction and insertion of stent(s)
 Bypass anastomosis for heart revascularization
 Heart revascularization by arterial implant
 Other heart revascularization
 Other operations on vessels of heart
 Other operations on heart and pericardium
 Pericardiocentesis
 Cardiotomy and pericardiotomy
 Diagnostic procedures on heart and pericardium
 Pericardiectomy and excision of lesion of heart
 Pericardiectomy
 Excision of aneurysm of heart
 Excision or destruction of other lesion or tissue of heart, open approach
 Maze procedure
 Excision or destruction of other lesion or tissue of heart, other approach
 Partial ventriculectomy
 Ventricular reduction surgery
 Repair of heart and pericardium
 Heart replacement procedures
 Heart transplantation
 Implantation of total replacement heart system
 Artificial heart
 Implantation of heart and circulatory assist system
 Insertion, revision, replacement, and removal of pacemaker leads; insertion of temporary pacemaker system; or revision of cardiac device pocket
 Insertion, replacement, removal, and revision of pacemaker device
 Other operations on heart and pericardium

Vessels 
 Incision, excision, and occlusion of vessels
 Incision of vessel
 Thrombectomy
 Endarterectomy
 Diagnostic procedures on blood vessels
 Resection of vessel with anastomosis
 Resection of vessel with replacement
 Ligation and stripping of varicose veins
 Other excision of vessel
 Interruption of the vena cava
 Other surgical occlusion of vessels
 Puncture of vessel
 Arterial catheterization
 Umbilical vein catheterization
 Venous catheterization, not elsewhere classified
 Venous cutdown
 Venous catheterization for renal dialysis
 Other puncture of artery
 Other puncture of vein
 Other operations on vessels
 Systemic to pulmonary artery shunt
 Intra-abdominal venous shunt
 transjugular intrahepatic portosystemic shunt (TIPS)
 Other shunt or vascular bypass
 Suture of vessel
 Revision of vascular procedure
 Other repair of vessels
 Extracorporeal circulation and procedures auxiliary to heart surgery
 Extracorporeal circulation auxiliary to open heart surgery
 Cardiopulmonary bypass
 Hypothermia (systemic) incidental to open heart surgery
 Cardioplegia
 Intraoperative cardiac pacemaker
 Extracorporeal membrane oxygenation (ECMO)
 Percutaneous cardiopulmonary bypass
 Endovascular repair of vessel
 Operations on carotid body and other vascular bodies
 Other operations on vessels
 Insertion of non-drug-eluting peripheral vessel stent(s)
 Freeing of vessel
 Injection of sclerosing agent into vein
 Insertion of vessel-to-vessel cannula
 Replacement of vessel-to-vessel cannula
 Hemodialysis
 Artificial kidney
 Hemodiafiltration
 Hemofiltration
 Renal dialysis
 Total body perfusion
 Other perfusionge, not otherwise specified
 Control of hemorrhage, not otherwise specified
 Other operations on vessels

(40–41) Operations on the hemic and lymphatic system 
() Operations on lymphatic system
() Incision of lymphatic structures
() Diagnostic procedures on lymphatic structures
() Simple excision of lymphatic structure
() Excision of deep cervical lymph node
() Excision of internal mammary lymph node
() Excision of axillary lymph node
() Excision of inguinal lymph node
() Simple excision of other lymphatic structure
 Simple lymphadenectomy
() Regional lymph node excision
() Radical excision of cervical lymph nodes
() Radical neck dissection, not otherwise specified
() Radical neck dissection, unilateral
() Radical neck dissection, bilateral
() Radical excision of other lymph nodes
() Operations on thoracic duct
() Other operations on lymphatic structures
() Operations on bone marrow and spleen
() Bone marrow or hematopoietic stem cell transplant
() Puncture of spleen
() Splenotomy
() Diagnostic procedures on bone marrow and spleen
() Excision or destruction of lesion or tissue of spleen
() Marsupialization of splenic cyst
() Excision of lesion or tissue of spleen
() Partial splenectomy
() Total splenectomy
() Other operations on spleen and bone marrow

(42–54) Operations on the digestive system 
 Operations on esophagus
 Excision of esophagus
 Esophagectomy, not otherwise specified
 Incision and excision of stomach
 Gastrotomy
 Gastrostomy
 Percutaneous (endoscopic) gastrostomy (PEG)
 Pyloromyotomy
 Local excision or destruction of lesion or tissue of stomach
 Partial gastrectomy with anastomosis to esophagus
 Partial gastrectomy with anastomosis to duodenum
 Partial gastrectomy with anastomosis to jejunum
 Other partial gastrectomy
 Total gastrectomy
 Other operations on stomach
 Vagotomy
 Gastroenterostomy without gastrectomy
 High gastric bypass
 Percutaneous (endoscopic) gastrojejunostomy
 Laparoscopic gastroenterostomy
 Other gastroenterostomy
 Incision, excision, and anastomosis of intestine
 Diagnostic procedures on small intestine
 Transabdominal endoscopy of small intestine
 Endoscopy of small intestine through artificial stoma
 Other endoscopy of small intestine
 Esophagogastroduodenoscopy (EGD)
 Closed (endoscopic) biopsy of small intestine
 Open biopsy of small intestine
 Esophagogastroduodenoscopy (EGD) with closed biopsy
 Other diagnostic procedures on small intestine
 Diagnostic procedures on large intestine
 Colonoscopy
 Partial excision of large intestine
 Right hemicolectomy
 Total intra-abdominal colectomy
 Other operations on intestine
 Colostomy
 Ileostomy
 Other enterostomy
 Revision of intestinal stoma
 Closure of intestinal stoma
 Fixation of intestine
 Other repair of intestine
 Dilation and manipulation of intestine
 Other operations on intestines
 Myotomy of sigmoid colon
 Myotomy of other parts of colon
 Revision of anastomosis of small intestine
 jejunoileal bypass
 Revision of anastomosis of large intestine
 Local perfusion of small intestine
 Local perfusion of large intestine
 Transplant of intestine
 Other
 Operations on appendix
 Appendectomy
 Operations on rectum, rectosigmoid and perirectal tissue
 Diagnostic procedures on rectum, rectosigmoid and perirectal tissue
 Transabdominal proctosigmoidoscopy
 Proctosigmoidoscopy through artificial stoma
 Rigid proctosigmoidoscopy
 Closed (endoscopic) biopsy of rectum
 Open biopsy of rectum
 Biopsy of perirectal tissue
 Other diagnostic procedures on rectum, rectosigmoid and perirectal tissue
 Operations on anus
 Incision or excision of perianal tissue
 Incision or excision of anal fistula
 Diagnostic procedures on anus and perianal tissue
 Local excision or destruction of other lesion or tissue of anus
 Procedures on hemorrhoids
 Excision of hemorrhoids
 Hemorrhoidectomy NOS
 Division of anal sphincter
 Left lateral anal sphincterotomy
 Posterior anal sphincterotomy
 Other anal sphincterotomy
 Excision of anus
 Repair of anus
 Other operations on anus
 Operations on liver
 Hepatotomy
 Diagnostic procedures on liver
 Local excision or destruction of liver tissue or lesion
 Marsupialization of lesion of liver
 Partial hepatectomy
 Other destruction of lesion of liver
 Lobectomy of liver
 Total hepatectomy
 Liver transplant
 Repair of liver
 Other operations on liver
 Operations on gallbladder and biliary tract
 Cholecystotomy and cholecystostomy
 Diagnostic procedures on biliary tract
 Endoscopic retrograde cholangiopancreatography (ERCP)
 Cholecystectomy
 Anastomosis of gallbladder or bile duct
 Incision of bile duct for relief of obstruction
 Other incision of bile duct
 Local excision or destruction of lesion or tissue of biliary ducts and sphincter of Oddi
 Repair of bile ducts
 Other operations on biliary ducts and sphincter of Oddi
 Other operations on biliary tract
 Operations on pancreas
 Pancreatotomy
 Diagnostic procedures on pancreas
 Local excision or destruction of pancreas and pancreatic duct
 Marsupialization of pancreatic cyst
 Internal drainage of pancreatic cyst
 Partial pancreatectomy
 Total pancreatectomy
 Radical pancreaticoduodenectomy
 Transplant of pancreas
 Other operations on pancreas
 Anastomosis of pancreas
 Repair of hernia
 hernia repair
 Other operations on abdominal region
 Laparotomy
 Other operations of abdominal region
 Percutaneous abdominal drainage
 Paracentesis

(55–59) Operations on the urinary system 
() Operations on kidney
() Nephrotomy and nephrostomy
() Nephrostomy
() Pyelotomy and pyelostomy
() Diagnostic procedures on kidney
() Local excision or destruction of lesion or tissue of kidney
() Partial nephrectomy
() Complete nephrectomy
() Transplant of kidney
() Nephropexy
() Other repair of kidney
() Other operations on kidney
() Operations on ureter
() Transurethral removal of obstruction from ureter and renal pelvis
() Ureteral meatotomy
() Ureterotomy
() Diagnostic procedures on ureter
() Ureteroscopy
() Ureterectomy
() Cutaneous uretero-ileostomy
() Other external urinary diversion
() Formation of other cutaneous ureterostomy
 Ureterostomy NOS
() Other anastomosis or bypass of ureter
() Urinary diversion to intestine
 Internal urinary diversion NOS
() Repair of ureter
() Other operations on ureter
() Operations on urinary bladder
() Transurethral clearance of bladder
() Cystotomy and cystostomy
() Vesicostomy
() Diagnostic procedures on bladder
() Transurethral excision or destruction of bladder tissue
() Other excision or destruction of bladder tissue
() Partial cystectomy
() Total cystectomy
() Other repair of urinary bladder
() Other operations on bladder
() Operations on urethra
() Suture of laceration of kidney
() Closure of nephrostomy and pyelostomy
() Closure of other fistula of kidney
() Reduction of torsion of renal pedicle
() Symphysiotomy for horseshoe kidney
() Anastomosis of kidney
() Correction of ureteropelvic junction
() Other
() Other operations on urinary tract

(60–64) Operations on the male genital organs 
() Operations on prostate and seminal vesicles
() Incision of prostate
() Diagnostic procedures on prostate and seminal vesicles
() Transurethral prostatectomy
() Transurethral (ultrasound) guided laser induced prostatectomy (TULIP)
() Other transurethral prostatectomy
 Transurethral resection of prostate (TURP)
() Suprapubic prostatectomy
() Retropubic prostatectomy
() Radical prostatectomy
() Other prostatectomy
() Operations on seminal vesicles
() Incision or excision of periprostatic tissue
() Other operations on prostate
() Operations on scrotum and tunica vaginalis
() Operations on testes
() Operations on spermatic cord, epididymis, and vas deferens
 Vasectomy and ligation of vas deferens
 Vasectomy
 Repair of vas deferens and epididymis
 Reconstruction of surgically divided vas deferens
() Operations on penis
() Circumcision
() Diagnostic procedures on the penis
() Local excision or destruction of lesion of penis
() Amputation of penis
() Repair and plastic operation on penis
() Operations for sex transformation, not elsewhere classified
() Other operations on male genital organs
 Dorsal or lateral slit of prepuce
 Incision of penis
 Division of penile adhesions
 Fitting of external prosthesis of penis
 Penlie prosthesis NOS
 Insertion or replacement of non-inflatable penlie prosthesis
 Removal of internal prosthesis of penis
 Insertion or replacement of inflatable penlie prosthesis
 Other operations on penis
 Other

(65–71) Operations on the female genital organs 
() Operations on ovary
() Oophorotomy
() Diagnostic procedures on ovaries
() Local excision or destruction of ovarian lesion or tissue
() Unilateral oophorectomy
() Unilateral salpingo-oophorectomy
() Bilateral oophorectomy
() Bilateral salpingo-oophorectomy
() Repair of ovary
() Lysis of adhesions of ovary and fallopian tube
() Other operations on ovary
() Operations on fallopian tubes
() Salpingotomy and salpingostomy
() Diagnostic procedures on fallopian tubes
() Bilateral endoscopic destruction or occlusion of fallopian tubes
() Other bilateral destruction or occlusion of fallopian tubes
() Total unilateral salpingectomy
() Total bilateral salpingectomy
() Other salpingectomy
() Repair of fallopian tube
() Insufflation of fallopian tube
() Other operations on fallopian tubes
() Operations on cervix
() Dilation of cervical canal, excludes Dilation and curettage
() Diagnostic procedures on cervix
() Conization of cervix excluding electrical/cryo
() Other excision or destruction of lesion or tissue of cervix
() Other incision and excision of uterus
 Hysterotomy
 Diagnostic procedures on uterus and supporting structures
 Hysteroscopy
 Excision or destruction of lesion or tissue of uterus
 Subtotal abdominal hysterectomy
 Total abdominal hysterectomy
 Vaginal hysterectomy
 Radical abdominal hysterectomy
 Radical vaginal hysterectomy
 Pelvic exenteration
 Other and unspecified hysterectomy
() Other operations on uterus and supporting structures
 Dilation and curettage of uterus
 Excision or destruction of lesion or tissue of uterus and supporting structures
 Repair of uterine supporting structures
 Paracervical uterine denervation
 Uterine repair
 Aspiration curettage of uterus
 Menstrual extraction or regulation
 Insertion of intrauterine contraceptive device
 Other operations on uterus, cervix, and supporting structures
() Operations on vagina and rectouterine pouch
 Culdocentesis
 Incision of vagina and rectouterine pouch
 Hymenotomy
 Culdotomy
 Lysis of intraluminal adhesions of vagina
 Other vaginotomy
 Diagnostic procedures on vagina and rectouterine pouch
 Local excision or destruction of vagina and rectouterine pouch
 Obliteration and total excision of vagina
 Vaginectomy
 Repair of cystocele and rectocele
 Vaginal construction and reconstruction
 Other repair of vagina
 Obliteration of vaginal vault
 Other operations on vagina and rectouterine pouch
() Operations on vulva and perineum
 Incision of vulva and perineum
 Diagnostic procedures on vulva
 Operations on Bartholin's gland
 Other local excision or destruction of vulva and perineum
 Operations on clitoris
 Radical vulvectomy
 Other vulvectomy
 Repair of vulva and perineum
 Other operations on vulva
 Other operations on female genital organs

(72–75) Obstetrical procedures 
 Forceps, vacuum, and breech delivery
 Other procedures inducing or assisting delivery
 Artificial rupture of membranes
 Induction of labor by artificial rupture of membranes
 Other artificial rupture of membranes
 Amniotomy
 Other surgical induction of labor
 Internal and combined version and extraction
 Failed forceps
 Medical induction of labor
 Manually assisted delivery
 Episiotomy
 Operations on fetus to facilitate delivery
 Other operations assisting delivery
 External version
 Replacement of prolapsed umbilical cord
 Incision of cervix to assist delivery
 Pubiotomy to assist delivery
 Obstetrical symphysiotomy
 Other
 Cesarean section and removal of fetus
 Other obstetric operations
 Intra-amniotic injection for abortion
 Diagnostic amniocentesis
 Intrauterine transfusion
 Other intrauterine operations on fetus and amnion
 Amnioscopy
 Fetoscopy
 Laparoamnioscopy
 Fetal EKG (scalp)
 Fetal blood sampling and biopsy
 Chorionic villus sampling
 Other fetal monitoring
 Other diagnostic procedures on fetus and amnion
 Correction of fetal defect
 Amnioinfusion
 Fetal pulse oximetry
 Manual removal of retained placenta
 Repair of current obstetric laceration of uterus
 Repair of other current obstetric laceration
 Manual exploration of uterine cavity, postpartum
 Obstetric tamponade of uterus or vagina
 Other obstetric operations

(76–84) Operations on the musculoskeletal system 
() Operations on facial bones and joints
 Incision of facial bone without division
 Diagnostic procedures on facial bones and joints
 Local excision or destruction of lesion of facial bone
 Partial ostectomy of facial bone
 Excision and reconstruction of facial bones
 Temporomandibular arthroplasty
 Other facial bone repair and orthognathic surgery
 Augmentation genioplasty
 Mentoplasty NOS
 Reduction of facial fracture
 Other operations on facial bones and joints
() Incision, excision, and division of other bones
 Sequestrectomy
 Other incision of bone without division
 Wedge osteotomy
 Other division of bone
 Biopsy of bone
 Excision and repair of bunion and other toe deformities
 Local excision of lesion or tissue of bone
 Excision of bone for graft
 Other partial ostectomy
 Total ostectomy
() Other operations on bones, except facial bones
 Bone graft
 Application of external fixator device
 Limb shortening procedures
 Limb lengthening procedures
 Other repair or plastic operations on bone
 Internal fixation of bone without fracture reduction
 Removal of implanted devices from bone
 Osteoclasis
 Diagnostic procedures on bone, not elsewhere classified
 Insertion of bone growth stimulator
() Reduction of fracture and dislocation
 Closed reduction of fracture without internal fixation
 Closed reduction of fracture with internal fixation
 Open reduction of fracture without internal fixation
 Open reduction of fracture with internal fixation
 Closed reduction of separated epiphysis
 Open reduction of separated epiphysis
 Debridement of open fracture site
 Closed reduction of dislocation
 Open reduction of dislocation
 Unspecified operation on bone injury
() Incision and excision of joint structures
 Arthroscopy
 Excision or destruction of intervertebral disc
 Excision of intervertebral disc
 Diskectomy
() Repair and plastic operations on joint structures
 Spinal fusion
 Arthrodesis and arthroereisis of foot and ankle
 Arthrodesis of other joint
 Refusion of spine
 Other repair of joint of lower extremity
 Joint replacement of lower extremity
 Total hip replacement
 Partial hip replacement
 Revision of hip replacement, not otherwise specified
 Total knee replacement
 Revision of knee replacement, not otherwise specified
 Total ankle replacement
 Replacement of joint of foot and toe
 Revision of joint replacement of lower extremity, not elsewhere classified
 Other procedures on spine
 Arthroplasty and repair of hand, fingers and wrist
 Arthroplasty and repair of shoulder and elbow
 Total shoulder replacement
 Partial shoulder replacement
 Repair of recurrent dislocation of shoulder
 Other repair of shoulder
 Total elbow replacement
 Other repair of elbow
 Other operations on joint structures
() Operations on muscle, tendon, and fascia of hand
 Incision of muscle, tendon, fascia, and bursa of hand
 Division of muscle, tendon, and fascia of hand
 Excision of lesion of muscle, tendon, and fascia of hand
 Other excision of soft tissue of hand
 Suture of muscle, tendon, and fascia of hand
 Transplantation of muscle and tendon of hand
 Reconstruction of thumb
 Plastic operation on hand with graft or implant
 Other plastic operations on hand
 Other operations on muscle, tendon, and fascia of hand
() Operations on muscle, tendon, fascia, and bursa, except hand
 Incision of muscle, tendon, fascia, and bursa
 Exploration of tendon sheath
 Myotomy
 Bursotomy
 Other incision of soft tissue
 Division of muscle, tendon, and fascia
 Achillotenotomy
 Adductor tenotomy of hip
 Other tenotomy
 Fasciotomy
 Other division of soft tissue
 Diagnostic procedures on muscle, tendon, fascia, and bursa, including that of hand
 Excision of lesion of muscle, tendon, fascia, and bursa
 Other excision of muscle, tendon, and fascia
 Bursectomy
 Suture of muscle, tendon, and fascia
 Reconstruction of muscle and tendon
 Other plastic operations on muscle, tendon, and fascia
 Other operations on muscle, tendon, fascia, and bursa
() Other procedures on musculoskeletal system
 Amputation of upper limb
 Amputation of lower limb
 Lower limb amputation, not otherwise specified
 Amputation of toe
 Amputation through foot
 Disarticulation of ankle
 Amputation of ankle through malleoli of tibia and fibula
 Other amputation below knee
 Disarticulation of knee
 Amputation above knee
 Disarticulation of hip
 Abdominopelvic amputation
 Hemipelvectomy
 Reattachment of extremity
 Revision of amputation stump
 Implantation or fitting of prosthetic limb device
 Implantation of other musculoskeletal devices and substances
 Insertion of interbody spinal fusion device
 Insertion of recombinant bone morphogenetic protein
 Implantation of internal limb lengthening device with kinetic distraction
 Implantation of other internal limb lengthening device
 Insertion of bone void filler
 Insertion of (cement) spacer
 Removal of (cement) spacer
 Implantation of interspinous process decompression device
 Insertion of other spinal devices
 Replacement of spinal disc
 Adjunct codes for external fixator devices
 Other operations on musculoskeletal system

(85–86) Operations on the integumentary system 
() Operations on the breast
() Mastotomy
() Diagnostic procedures on breast
() Excision or destruction of breast tissue
() Local excision of lesion of breast
 Lumpectomy
() Reduction mammoplasty and subcutaneous mammectomy
() Mastectomy
() Augmentation mammoplasty
() Mastopexy
() Total reconstruction of breast
() Other repair and plastic operations on breast
() Other operations on the breast
() Operations on skin and subcutaneous tissue
() Incision of skin and subcutaneous tissue
() Aspiration of skin and subcutaneous tissue
() Injection or tattooing of skin lesion or defect
() Incision of pilonidal sinus or cyst
() Other incision with drainage of skin and subcutaneous tissue
() Incision with removal of foreign body or device from skin and subcutaneous tissue
() Insertion of totally implantable infusion pump
() Insertion of totally implantable vascular access device (VAD)
() Other incision of skin and subcutaneous tissue
 Escharotomy
() Diagnostic procedures on skin and subcutaneous tissue
() Excision or destruction of lesion or tissue of skin and subcutaneous tissue
() Other local excision or destruction of lesion or tissue of skin and subcutaneous tissue
() Radical excision of skin lesion
() Suture or other closure of skin and subcutaneous tissue
() Free skin graft
() Free skin graft, not otherwise specified
() Full-thickness skin graft to hand
() Other skin graft to hand
() Full-thickness skin graft to other sites
() Hair transplant
() Heterograft to skin
() Homograft to skin
() Pedicle grafts or flaps
() Other repair and reconstruction of skin and subcutaneous tissue
() Other operations on skin and subcutaneous tissue

(87–99) Miscellaneous diagnostic and therapeutic procedures

Diagnostic radiology 
 Diagnostic radiology
 Soft tissue x-ray of thorax
 Other x-ray of thorax
 X-ray of urinary system
 Computerized axial tomography of kidney
 CAT scan of kidney
 Other nephrotomogram
 Intravenous pyelogram
 Diuretic infusion pyelogram
 Retrograde pyelogram
 Percutaneous pyelogram
 Retrograde cystourethrogram
 Other cystogram
 Ileal conduitogram
 Other x-ray of the urinary system
 KUB x-ray
 Other diagnostic radiology and related techniques
 Soft tissue x-ray of abdomen
 Other x-ray of abdomen
 Skeletal x-ray of extremities and pelvis
 Other x-ray
 Arteriography using contrast material
 Angiocardiography using contrast material
 Phlebography
 Diagnostic ultrasound
 Thermography
 Other diagnostic imaging
 Diagnostic imaging, not elsewhere classified
 Magnetic resonance imaging of brain and brain stem
 Magnetic resonance imaging of chest and myocardium
 Magnetic resonance imaging of spinal canal
 Magnetic resonance imaging of musculoskeletal
 Magnetic resonance imaging of pelvis, prostate, and bladder
 Other intraoperative magnetic resonance imaging
 Magnetic resonance imaging of other and unspecified sites
 Bone mineral density studies

Interview, evaluation, consultation, and examination 
 Interview, evaluation, consultation, and examination
 Diagnostic interview, consultation, and evaluation
 Anatomic and physiologic measurements and manual examinations—nervous system and sense organs
 Electroencephalogram
 Anatomic and physiologic measurements and manual examinations -- genitourinary system
 Urinary manometry
 Cystometrogram
 Urethral sphincter electromyogram
 Uroflowmetry (UFR)
 Urethral pressure profile (UPP)
 Gynecological examination
 Other nonoperative genitourinary system measurements
 Other anatomic and physiologic measurements and manual examinations
 Cardiac stress tests, pacemaker and defibrillator checks
 Other nonoperative cardiac and vascular diagnostic procedures
 Circulatory monitoring
 General physical examination
 Autopsy
 (-) Microscopic examination
 fourth-digit codes:
 1 bacterial smear
 2 culture
 3 culture and sensitivity
 4 parasitology
 5 toxicology
 6 cell block and Papanicolaou smear
 9 other microscopic examination
 specimen from nervous system and of spinal fluid
 specimen from endocrine gland, not elsewhere classified
 specimen from eye
 specimen from ear, nose, throat, and larynx
 specimen from trachea, bronchus, pleura, lung, and other thoracic specimen, and of sputum
 blood
 specimen from spleen and of bone marrow
 specimen from lymph node and of lymph
 specimen from upper gastrointestinal tract and of vomitus
 specimen from lower gastrointestinal tract and of stool
 specimen from liver, biliary tract, and pancreas
 peritoneal and retroperitoneal specimen
 specimen from kidney, ureter, perirenal and periureteral tissue
 specimen from bladder, urethra, prostate, seminal vesicle, perivesical tissue, and of urine and semen
 specimen from female genital tract
 specimen from musculoskeletal system and of joint fluid
 specimen from skin and other integument
 specimen from operative wound
 specimen from other site
 specimen from unspecified site

Nuclear medicine 
 Nuclear medicine
 Radioisotope scan and function study
 Other radioisotope scan
 Therapeutic radiology and nuclear medicine
 Stereotactic radiosurgery

Physical therapy, respiratory therapy, rehabilitation, and related procedures 
 Physical therapy, respiratory therapy, rehabilitation, and related procedures
 Diagnostic physical therapy
 Physical therapy exercises
 Other physical therapy musculoskeletal manipulations
 Other physical therapy therapeutic procedures
 Assisted exercise in pool
 Whirlpool treatment
 Other hydrotherapy
 Diathermy
 Other heat therapy
 Cardiac retraining
 Prenatal training
 Combined physical therapy without mention of the components
 Other physical therapy
 Skeletal traction and other traction
 Other immobilization, pressure, and attention to wound
 Application of neck support
 Application of cervical collar
 Application of Minerva jacket
 Osteopathic manipulative treatment
 Speech and reading rehabilitation and rehabilitation of the blind
 Other rehabilitation therapy
 Recreation therapy
 Educational therapy
 Occupational therapy
 Music therapy
 Vocational rehabilitation
 Rehabilitation, not elsewhere classified
 Respiratory therapy

Procedures related to the psyche 
 Procedures related to the psyche
 Psychologic evaluation and testing
 Administration of intelligence test
 Administration of Stanford-Binet
 Administration of Wechsler Adult Intelligence Scale
 Administration of Wechsler Intelligence Scale for Children
 Administration of psychologic test
 Administration of Bender Visual-Motor Gestalt Test
 Administration of Benton Visual Retention Test
 Administration of Minnesota Multiphasic Personality Inventory
 Administration of Wechsler Memory Scale
 Character analysis
 Other psychologic evaluation and testing
 Psychologic mental status determination, not otherwise specified
 Psychiatric interviews, consultations, and evaluations
 Psychiatric mental status determination
 Routine psychiatric visit, not otherwise specified
 Psychiatric commitment evaluation
 Other psychiatric interview and evaluation
 Psychiatric somatotherapy
 Narcoanalysis
 Lithium therapy
 Neuroleptic therapy
 Chemical shock therapy
 Other psychiatric drug therapy
 Subconvulsive electroshock therapy
 Other electroshock therapy
 Electroconvulsive therapy (ECT)
 Other psychiatric somatotherapy
 Individual psychotherapy
 Psychoanalysis
 Hypnotherapy
 Behavior therapy
 Aversion therapy
 Behavior modification
 Desensitization therapy
 Extinction therapy
 Relaxation training
 Token economy
 Other individual psychotherapy
 Biofeedback
 Other psychotherapy and counselling
 Group therapy for psychosexual dysfunction
 Family therapy
 Psychodrama
 Other group therapy
 Drug addiction counselling
 Alcoholism counselling
 Other counselling
 Referral for psychologic rehabilitation
 Alcohol and drug rehabilitation and detoxification

Ophthalmologic and otologic diagnosis and treatment 
 Ophthalmologic and otologic diagnosis and treatment
 General and subjective eye examination
 Limited eye examination
 Comprehensive eye examination
 Extended ophthalmologic work-up
 Eye examination under anesthesia
 Visual field study
 Color vision study
 Dark adaptation study
 Eye examination, not otherwise specified
 Examinations of form and structure of eye
 Fundus photography
 Fluorescein angiography or angioscopy of eye
 Ultrasound study of eye
 X-ray study of eye
 Ocular motility study
 P32 and other tracer studies of eye
 Objective functional tests of eye
 Electroretinogram (ERG)
 Electro-oculogram (EOG)
 Visual evoked potential (VEP)
 Electronystagmogram (ENG)
 Electromyogram of eye (EMG)
 Tonography, provocative tests, and other glaucoma testing
 Special vision services
 Nonoperative procedures related to hearing
 Audiometry
 Clinical test of hearing
 Audiological evaluation
 Clinical vestibular function tests
 Rotation tests
 Other nonoperative procedures related to hearing

Nonoperative intubation and irrigation 
 Nonoperative intubation and irrigation
 Nonoperative intubation of gastrointestinal and respiratory tracts
 Insertion of nasopharyngeal airway
 Insertion of oropharyngeal airway
 Insertion of esophageal obturator airway
 Insertion of endotracheal tube
 Other intubation of respiratory tract
 Insertion of Sengstaken tube
 Esophageal tamponade
 Insertion of other (naso-)gastric tube
 Insertion of (naso-)intestinal tube
 Miller-Abbott tube (for decompression)
 Insertion of rectal tube
 Other nonoperative insertion
 Nonoperative dilation and manipulation
 Nonoperative alimentary tract irrigation, cleaning, and local instillation
 Gastric cooling
 Gastric freezing
 Gastric lavage
 Other irrigation of (naso-)gastric tube
 Gastric gavage
 Irrigation of gastrostomy or enterostomy
 Proctoclysis
 Removal of impacted feces
 Nonoperative irrigation, cleaning, and local instillation of other digestive and genitourinary organs
 Irrigation of cholecystostomy and other biliary tube
 Irrigation of pancreatic tube
 Digestive tract instillation, except gastric gavage
 Vaginal douche
 Irrigation of nephrostomy and pyelostomy
 Irrigation of ureterostomy and ureteral catheter
 Irrigation of cystostomy
 Irrigation of other indwelling urinary catheter
 Other genitourinary instillation
 Other nonoperative irrigation and cleaning
 Enteral infusion of concentrated nutritional substances
 Other continuous invasive mechanical ventilation

Replacement and removal of therapeutic appliances/nonoperative removal of foreign body or calculus 
 Replacement and removal of therapeutic appliances
 Nonoperative replacement of gastrointestinal appliance
 Nonoperative replacement of musculoskeletal and integumentary system appliance
 Other nonoperative replacement
 Nonoperative removal of therapeutic device from head and neck
 Nonoperative removal of therapeutic device from thorax
 Nonoperative removal of therapeutic device from digestive system
 Nonoperative removal of therapeutic device from urinary system
 Nonoperative removal of therapeutic device from genital system
 Other nonoperative removal of therapeutic device
 Nonoperative removal of foreign body or calculus
 Removal of intraluminal foreign body from digestive system without incision
 Removal of intraluminal foreign body from other sites without incision
 Removal of other foreign body without incision
 Extracorporeal shockwave lithotripsy (ESWL)

Other nonoperative procedures 
 Other nonoperative procedures
 Transfusion of blood and blood components
 Injection or infusion of therapeutic or prophylactic substance
 Injection or infusion of other therapeutic or prophylactic substance
 Injection or infusion of platelet inhibitor
 Injection of antibiotic
 Injection of other anti-infective
 Injection of steroid
 Injection of other hormone
 Injection or infusion of cancer chemotherapeutic substance
 Injection of tranquilizer
 Iontophoresis
 Injection or infusion of biological response modifier (BRM) as an antineoplastic agent
 Injection or infusion of other therapeutic or prophylactic substance
 Prophylactic vaccination and inoculation against certain bacterial diseases
 Prophylactic vaccination and inoculation against certain viral diseases
 Other vaccination and inoculation
 Conversion of cardiac rhythm
 Cardiopulmonary resuscitation, not otherwise specified
 Atrial cardioversion
 Other electric countershock of heart
 Closed chest cardiac massage
 Carotid sinus stimulation
 Other conversion of cardiac rhythm
 Therapeutic apheresis or other injection, administration, or infusion of other therapeutic or prophylactic substance
 Miscellaneous physical procedures
 Hypothermia (central) (local)
 Ultraviolet light therapy
 Other phototherapy
 Isolation
 Hyperthermia for treatment of cancer
 Non-invasive placement of bone growth stimulator
 Therapeutic photopheresis
 Other miscellaneous procedures

See also 
 ICD-10 Procedure Coding System

External links 
 Tabular index of codes

Clinical procedure classification